James Francis Durante (February 10, 1893 – January 29, 1980) was an American comedian, actor, singer, and pianist. His distinctive gravelly speech, Lower East Side accent, comic language-butchery, jazz-influenced songs, and prominent nose helped make him one of America's most familiar and popular personalities of the 1920s through the 1970s. He often referred to his nose as the schnozzola (Italianization of the American Yiddish slang word schnoz, meaning "big nose"), and the word became his nickname.

Early life

Childhood
Durante was born on the Lower East Side of New York City. He was the youngest of four children born to Rosa (Lentino) and Bartolomeo Durante, both immigrants from Salerno, Campania, Italy. Bartolomeo was a barber. Young Jimmy served as an altar boy at St. Malachy Roman Catholic Church, known as the Actor's Chapel.

Early career
Durante dropped out of school in seventh grade to become a full-time ragtime pianist. He first played with his cousin, whose name was also Jimmy Durante. It was a family act, but he was too professional for his cousin. He continued working the city's piano bar circuit and earned the nickname "Ragtime Jimmy," before he joined one of the first recognizable jazz bands in New York, the Original New Orleans Jazz Band. Durante was the only member not from New Orleans. His routine of breaking into a song to deliver a joke, with band or orchestra chord punctuation after each line, became a Durante trademark. In 1920 the group was renamed Jimmy Durante's Jazz Band.

Stardom
By the mid-1920s, Durante had become a vaudeville star and radio personality in a trio named Clayton, Jackson and Durante. Lou Clayton and Eddie Jackson, Durante's closest friends, often reunited with Durante in subsequent years. Jackson and Durante appeared in the Cole Porter musical The New Yorkers, which opened on Broadway on December 8, 1930. Earlier the same year, the team appeared in the movie Roadhouse Nights, ostensibly based on Dashiell Hammett's novel Red Harvest.

By 1934, Durante had a major record hit with his own novelty composition, "Inka Dinka Doo", with lyrics by Ben Ryan. It became his theme song for the rest of his life. A year later, Durante starred on Broadway in the Billy Rose stage musical Jumbo. A scene in which a police officer stopped Durante's character—who was leading a live elephant across the stage—to ask "what are you doing with that elephant?", followed by Durante's reply What elephant?" was a regular show-stopper. Durante also appeared on Broadway in Show Girl (1929), Strike Me Pink (1934) and Red, Hot and Blue (1936).

During the early 1930s, Durante alternated between Hollywood and Broadway. Outstanding among his early motion pictures was The Phantom President (1932), starring George M. Cohan with Durante as his gregarious pal. Durante then replaced Cliff Edwards as the comic foil in Metro-Goldwyn-Mayer's Buster Keaton comedies: Speak Easily (1932), The Passionate Plumber (1932), and What! No Beer? (1933). The Keaton-Durante series was very successful and might have continued, but Keaton was experiencing personal problems including loss of control over his movies, alcohol abuse, and a messy divorce, so MGM fired Keaton and kept Durante. MGM gave Durante leads in moderately budgeted comedies like Meet the Baron (1933) and Hollywood Party (1934), but he couldn't carry an entire feature film; he was more effective as somebody's sidekick, and MGM released him in 1934. 

Durante went to England to work in a Richard Tauber film musical, Land Without Music (released in the United States as Forbidden Music). Upon his return to Hollywood, there were no movie jobs for him. Columbia Pictures offered him a major role in its college musical Start Cheering, filmed in 1937, and he received excellent critical notices, re-establishing him in movies. From then on, he almost always appeared in strong supporting roles.

Durante went on to appear in the Gene Autry musical western Melody Ranch (1940), The Man Who Came to Dinner (1942, playing Banjo, a character based on Harpo Marx), Ziegfeld Follies (1945), Billy Rose's Jumbo (1962, based on the 1935 musical), and It's a Mad, Mad, Mad, Mad World (1963).

Radio

On September 10, 1933, Durante appeared on Eddie Cantor's NBC radio show, The Chase and Sanborn Hour, continuing until November 12 of that year. When Cantor left the show, Durante took over as its star from April 22 to September 30, 1934. He then moved on to The Jumbo Fire Chief Program (1935–1936).

Durante teamed with Garry Moore for The Durante-Moore Show in 1943. Durante's comic chemistry with the young, brushcut Moore brought Durante an even larger audience. "Dat's my boy dat said dat!" became an instant catchphrase, which would later inspire the cartoon Augie Doggie and Doggie Daddy. The duo was one of the nation's favorites for the rest of the decade. Their Armed Forces Radio Network Command Performance with Frank Sinatra remains a favorite of radio-show collectors today. Moore left the duo in mid-1947, and the program returned October 1, 1947 as The Jimmy Durante Show. Durante continued the show for three more years and featured a reunion of Clayton, Jackson, and Durante on his April 21, 1948 broadcast.

Television
Although Durante made his television debut on November 1, 1950 (on the Four Star Revue – see below) he continued to keep a presence in radio, as a frequent guest on Tallulah Bankhead's two-year NBC comedy-variety show The Big Show. Durante was one of the cast on the show's premiere November 5, 1950, along with humorist Fred Allen, singers Mindy Carson and Frankie Laine, stage musical performer Ethel Merman, actors Jose Ferrer and Paul Lukas, and comic-singer Danny Thomas (about to become a major television star in his own right). A highlight of the premiere was Durante and Thomas, whose own nose rivaled Durante's, in a routine in which Durante accused Thomas of stealing his nose. "Stay outta dis, no-nose!" Durante barked at Bankhead to a big laugh.

From 1950 to 1951, Durante was the host once a month (alternating with Ed Wynn, Danny Thomas, and Jack Carson) on NBC's comedy-variety series Four Star Revue, airing on Wednesday evenings at 8 p.m. Jimmy continued with the show until 1954.

Durante then hosted a half-hour variety show, The Jimmy Durante Show—on NBC from October 2, 1954, to June 23, 1956.

Beginning in the early 1950s, Durante teamed with sidekick Sonny King, a collaboration that would continue until Durante's death. Several times in the 1960s, Durante served as host of ABC's variety hour The Hollywood Palace, which was taped live (and consequently included ad-libs by the seasoned vaudevillian). His last regular television series paired him with The Lennon Sisters and was titled, appropriately, Jimmy Durante Presents the Lennon Sisters. The series lasted for one season on ABC (1969–1970).

Marriages
Durante's first wife was Jean "Jeanne" Olson, whom he married on June 19, 1921. She was born in Ohio on August 31, 1896. She was 46 years old when she died on Valentine's Day in 1943, after a lingering heart ailment of about two years, although different newspaper accounts of her death suggest she was 45 or perhaps 52. As her death was not immediately expected, Durante was touring in New York at the time and returned to Los Angeles right away to complete the funeral arrangements.

Durante's radio show was bracketed with two trademarks: "Inka Dinka Doo" as his opening theme, and the invariable signoff that became another familiar national catchphrase: "Good night, Mrs. Calabash, wherever you are." For years no one knew who Mrs. Calabash referred to and Durante preferred to keep the mystery alive until 1966. One theory was that it referred to the owner of a restaurant in Calabash, North Carolina, where Durante and his troupe had stopped to eat. He was so taken by the food, the service, and the chitchat he told the owner that he would make her famous. Since he did not know her name, he referred to her as "Mrs. Calabash". At a National Press Club meeting in 1966 (broadcast on NBC's Monitor program), Durante finally revealed that it was indeed a tribute to his wife. While driving across the country, they stopped in a small town called Calabash, North Carolina whose name Jean had loved. "Mrs. Calabash" became his pet name for her, and he signed off his radio program with "Good night, Mrs. Calabash." He added "wherever you are" after the first year.

Durante married his second wife, Margaret "Margie" Little, at St. Malachy Roman Catholic Church in New York City on December 14, 1960. As a teenager she had been crowned Queen of the New Jersey State Fair. She attended New York University before being hired by the legendary Copacabana in New York City. She and Durante met there 16 years before their marriage, when he performed there and she was a hatcheck girl. She was 41 while he was 67 when they married. With help from their attorney, Mary G. Rogan, the couple were able to adopt a baby, Cecilia Alicia (nicknamed CeCe and now known as CeCe Durante-Bloum), on Christmas Day, 1961. CeCe became a champion horsewoman and then a horse trainer and horseriding instructor. Margie died on June 7, 2009, at the age of 89.

Charitable work
On August 15, 1958, for his charitable acts, Durante was awarded a three-foot-high brass loving cup by the Al Bahr Shriners Temple. The inscription reads: "JIMMY DURANTE THE WORLD'S MOST FAMOUS COMEDIAN. A loving cup to you Jimmy, it's larger than your nose, but smaller than your heart. Happiness always, Al Bahr Temple, August 15, 1958." Jimmy Durante started out his career with Clayton and Jackson and when he became a big star and they were left behind, he kept them on his payroll for the rest of their lives.

Durante's love for children continued through the Fraternal Order of Eagles, who among many causes raise money for disabled and abused children. At Durante's first appearance at the Eagles International Convention in 1961, Judge Bob Hansen inquired about his fee for performing. Durante replied, "Do not even mention money judge or I'll have to mention a figure that'll make ya sorry ya brought it up." "What can we do then?" asked Hansen. "Help da kids," was Durante's reply. Durante performed for many years at Eagles conventions free of charge, even refusing travel money. The Fraternal Order of Eagles changed the name of their children's fund to the Jimmy Durante Children's Fund in his honor, and in his memory have raised over $20 million to help children. A reporter once remarked of Durante after an interview: "You could warm your hands on this one." One of the projects built using money from the Durante Fund was a heated therapy swimming pool at the Hughen School in Port Arthur, Texas. Completed in 1968, Durante named the pool the "Inka Dinka Doo Pool".

Religion
Durante was deeply religious and a staunch Roman Catholic. In Las Vegas, he was seen regularly after Sunday Mass outside of the Guardian Angel Cathedral, standing next to the priest and greeting parishioners as they left the church. In 1968 he recorded 10 spiritual and inspirational songs for the album Songs for Sunday; it was expanded to 20 selections for a CD release under the same title in 1996.

Politics
Durante was an active member of the Democratic Party. In 1933, he appeared in an advertisement shown in theaters supporting Franklin D. Roosevelt's New Deal programs and wrote a musical score titled Give a Man a Job to accompany it. He performed at both the inaugural gala for President John F. Kennedy in 1961 and a year later at the famous Madison Square Garden rally for the Democratic party that featured Marilyn Monroe singing "Happy Birthday" to JFK.

Later years

Durante continued his film appearances through It's a Mad, Mad, Mad, Mad World and television appearances through the early 1970s. He narrated the Rankin-Bass animated Christmas special Frosty the Snowman (1969), re-run for many years since. The television work also included a series of commercial spots for Kellogg's Corn Flakes cereals in the mid-1960s, which introduced Durante's gravelly growl and narrow-eyed, large-nosed countenance to millions of children. "Dis is Jimmy Durante, in puy-son!" was his introduction to some of the Kellogg's spots. One of his last appearances was in a memorable television commercial for the 1973 Volkswagen Beetle, where he proclaimed that the new, roomier Beetle had "plenty of breathin' room... for de old schnozzola!"

In 1963, Durante recorded the album of pop standards September Song. The album became a best-seller and provided Durante's re-introduction to yet another generation, almost three decades later. From the Jimmy Durante's Way of Life album came the gravelly interpretation of the song "As Time Goes By", which accompanied the opening credits of the romantic comedy hit Sleepless in Seattle, while his version of "Make Someone Happy" launched the film's closing credits. Both are included on the film's best-selling soundtrack. Durante also recorded a cover of the well-known song "I'll Be Seeing You", which became a trademark song on his 1960s TV show and was featured in the 2004 film The Notebook.

He wrote a foreword for a humorous book compiled by Dick Hyman titled Cockeyed Americana. In the first paragraph of the "Foreword!", as Durante called it, he describes meeting Hyman and discussing the book and the contribution that Hyman wanted Durante to make to it. Durante wrote "Before I can say gaziggadeegasackeegazobbath, we're at his luxurious office." After reading the material Hyman had compiled for the book, Durante commented on it: "COLOSSAL, GIGANTIC, MAGNANIMOUS, and last but not first, AURORA BOREALIS. [Capitalization Durante's] Four little words that make a sentence—and a sentence that will eventually get me six months."

Durante retired from performing in 1972, after a stroke confined him to a wheelchair. He made a public appearance in 1974 when MGM held a reunion of its former stars, in connection with its new That's Entertainment! film. 

Jimmy Durante died of pneumonia in Santa Monica, California, on January 29, 1980, 12 days before he would have turned 87. He received Catholic funeral rites four days later, with fellow entertainers including Desi Arnaz, Ernest Borgnine, Marty Allen, and Jack Carter in attendance, and was interred at Holy Cross Cemetery in Culver City, California.

Animation
Jimmy Durante is known to most modern audiences as the character who narrated and sang the 1969 animated special Frosty the Snowman. He also performed the Ron Goodwin title song to the 1968 comedy-adventure Monte Carlo or Bust (titled Those Daring Young Men in Their Jaunty Jalopies in the U.S.) sung over the film's animated opening credits.

Allusions and references in animation
While his own career in animation was limited, Durante's distinctive voice, looks, and catchphrases earned him numerous depictions and allusions in animation. He was caricatured as early as 1933, alongside Buster Keaton in the Ub Iwerks cartoon Soda Squirt. Director Tex Avery presented him as a persecuted turkey in the MGM cartoon Jerky Turkey. In MGM's Tom and Jerry cartoons with father-and-son bulldogs Spike and Tyke, Durante was referenced with a raspy voice and an affectionate "Dat's my boy!" In another Tom and Jerry short, a starfish lands on Tom's head, giving him a big nose. He then proceeds with Durante's famous "Ha-cha-cha-cha" call. The 1943 Tex Avery cartoon "What's Buzzin' Buzzard" featured a vulture with a voice that sounded like Jimmy Durante. Hanna-Barbera continued to use the Durante voice (imitated by Doug Young) in Hanna-Barbera's Augie Doggie and Doggie Daddy cartoons, Doggie Daddy invariably addressing the junior beagle with a Durante-like "Augie, my son, my son", and with frequent citations of, "That's my boy who said that!"

Many Looney Tunes/Merrie Melodies cartoons had characters based on Durante. One Harman-Ising short from 1933, Bosko's Picture Show, featured a caricature of Adolf Hitler chasing Durante with a meat cleaver. Two examples from the 1940s include A Gruesome Twosome, which features a cat based on Durante, and Baby Bottleneck, which in unedited versions opens with a Durante-like stork. Book Revue shows the well-known (at that time) 1924 Edna Ferber novel So Big featuring a Durante caricature on the cover. The "so big" refers to his nose, and as a runaway criminal turns the corner by the book, Durante turns sideways using his nose to trip the criminal, allowing his capture. In Hollywood Daffy, Durante is directly depicted as himself, pronouncing his catchphrase "Those are the conditions that prevail!" In The Mouse-Merized Cat, Catstello (a Lou Costello mouse) briefly is hypnotized to imitate Jimmy Durante singing Lullaby of Broadway. One of Durante's common catchphrases "I got a million of 'em!" was used as Bugs' final line in Stage Door Cartoon.

A Durante-like voice was also used for Marvel Comics superhero the Thing in the Hanna-Barbera cartoon Fred and Barney Meet the Thing. The voice and appearance of Crispy, the mascot for Crispy Critters cereal, was also based on Durante. In Mickey Mouse Works, a character named Mortimer Mouse (voiced by Maurice LaMarche) was based on Durante, complete with the "ha-cha-cha!". One of the main characters in Terrytoons' Heckle and Jeckle cartoon series also takes to imitating Jimmy in 1948's "Taming The Cat" ("Get a couple of song birds today...").

Legacy
Since Durante's death, his songs have featured in several films. Dan Aykroyd and Kim Basinger performed impressions of Durante from The Man Who Came to Dinner singing "Did You Ever Have the Feeling" in 1988's My Stepmother Is an Alien. His performance of "Young at Heart" was featured in City Slickers (1991) and his versions of "As Time Goes By" and "Make Someone Happy" played over the opening and closing credits of Sleepless in Seattle (1993). Michael J. Fox performed an impression of Durante singing "Inka Dinka Doo" in 1994's Greedy. His rendition of "Smile" featured in the film, and trailer for, Joker (2019). His rendition of "The Glory of Love" was also used in the end credits of the horror film Orphan (2009), and in its prequel Orphan: First Kill (2022), with a rendition of it sung by Isabelle Fuhrman.

Filmography

 Roadhouse Nights (1930) as Daffy
 New Adventures of Get Rich Quick Wallingford (1931) as Schnozzle
 The Christmas Party (1931, Short) as Santa Claus (uncredited)
 The Cuban Love Song (1931) as O.O. Jones
 Jackie Cooper's Birthday Party (1931, Short)
 Hollywood on Parade: Down Memory Lane (1932, Short)
 Hollywood on Parade (1932, Short)
 The Passionate Plumber (1932) as Julius J. McCracken
 The Wet Parade (1932) as Abe Shilling
 Speak Easily (1932) as James
 Blondie of the Follies (1932) as Jimmy
 The Phantom President (1932) as Curly Cooney
 Le plombier amoureux (1932) as Tony
 Give a Man a Job (1933, Short)
 What! No Beer? (1933) as Jimmy Potts
 Hollywood on Parade No. 9 (1933, Short)
 Hell Below (1933)  as Ptomaine, Ship's Cook
 Broadway to Hollywood (1933) as Himself, Hollywood Character
 Meet the Baron (1933) as Joe McGoo – the Favorite 'Schnozzle' of the Screen
 Palooka (1934) as Knobby Walsh
 George White's Scandals (1934) as Happy McGillicuddy
 Strictly Dynamite (1934) as Moxie
 Hollywood Party (1934) as Durante/Schnarzan
 Student Tour (1934) as Hank Merman, Trainer of the Crew
 Carnival (1935) as Fingers
 Land Without Music (1936) as Jonah J. Whistler
 Start Cheering (1938) as Willie Gumbatz
 Sally, Irene and Mary (1938) as Jefferson Twitchel
 Little Miss Broadway (1938) as Jimmy Clayton
 Melody Ranch (1940) as Cornelius J. Courtney
 You're in the Army Now (1941) as Jeeper Smith
 The Man Who Came to Dinner (1942) as Banjo
 Two Girls and a Sailor (1944) as Billy Kipp
 Music for Millions (1944) as Andrews
 Ziegfeld Follies (1945) (scenes deleted)
 Two Sisters from Boston (1946) as Spike
 It Happened in Brooklyn (1947) as Nick Lombardi
 This Time for Keeps (1947) as Ferdi Farro
 On an Island with You (1948) as Buckley
 The Great Rupert (1950) as Mr. Louie Amendola
 The Milkman (1950) as Breezy Albright
 Screen Snapshots: Hollywood Premiere (1955, Short) as Himself
 The Heart of Show Business (1957, Short) as Himself
 Beau James (1957) as Himself (cameo, uncredited)
 Pepe (1960) as Himself (cameo)
 The Last Judgment (1961) as The man with the large nose
 Billy Rose's Jumbo (1962) as Anthony 'Pop' Wonder
 It's a Mad, Mad, Mad, Mad World (1963) as "Smiler" Grogan
 Frosty the Snowman (1969) as Himself, Narrator (voice)

Discography
 1959: At the Piano – In Person
 1963: September Song
 1964: Hello Young Lovers
 1964: Jimmy Durante's Way of Life...
 1966: One of Those Songs
 1967: Songs for Sunday

References

External links

 
 
 
 
 Jerry Haendiges Vintage Radio Logs: The Jimmy Durante Show (1933–50)
 Jerry Haendiges Vintage Radio Logs: The Jimmy Durante and Garry Moore Show (1943–47)
 Jimmy Durante on "Four Star Revue/All Star Revue" (1950–53) at Classic TV Info.
 Jimmy Durante on "The Colgate Comedy Hour" (1953–54) at Classic TV Info.
 Jimmy Durante on "Texaco Star Theater" (1954–56) at Classic TV Info.
 Biography with list of credits
 Jimmy Durante and Eddie Cantor (1947)
 Command Performance (March 15, 1945)
 Red Hot Jazz Archive: Jimmy Durante
 Literature on Jimmy Durante
 Archival Television Audio on Jimmy Durante

1893 births
1980 deaths
American burlesque performers
American jazz musicians
American male comedians
American male film actors
American male musical theatre actors
American male radio actors
American male stage actors
American male television actors
American male voice actors
American people of Italian descent
American Roman Catholics
Burials at Holy Cross Cemetery, Culver City
California Democrats
Deaths from pneumonia in California
Gennett Records artists
New York (state) Democrats
Original Memphis Five members
Original New Orleans Jazz Band members
Outstanding Performance by a Lead Actor in a Comedy Series Primetime Emmy Award winners
Peabody Award winners
Vaudeville performers
20th-century American comedians
20th-century American male actors
20th-century American musicians
People from the Lower East Side
20th-century American male singers
20th-century American singers
Jazz musicians from New York (state)
United Service Organizations entertainers